Diagoras Vrachnaiika Football Club is a Greek football club based in Vrachnaiika, Achaea, Greece.

Honours

Domestic

  Achaea FCA Champions: 3
 2007–08, 2013–14, 2016–17
  Achaea FCA Cup Winners: 2
 2011–12, 2017–18
  Achaea FCA Super Cup Winners: 3
 2012, 2014, 2017

References

Achaea
Association football clubs established in 1960
1960 establishments in Greece
Gamma Ethniki clubs